Asphalt for Eden is the sixth studio album released by experimental hip hop group dälek, first released on April 22, 2016 through Profound Lore, a label that focuses mostly on heavy metal, but also releases experimental records. First announced in early 2016, the album is the first official full length released by the band since Gutter Tactics from 2009 and their first release since their announced hiatus from 2011 and subsequent reunion in 2015. A music video was produced for the track "Guaranteed Struggle" and first premiered on Vice on March 8, and video for the track "Masked Laughter (Nothing's Left)" was produced and premiered on the official Profound Lore website on February 11, 2016.

The artwork, which was done by Paul Romano, was first unveiled through Dead Verse on February 10. The record first became available for streaming on April 20 via the official Profound Lore SoundCloud page.

Track listing

Personnel
Mike Mare - performance, writing, recording, production, mixing
Will Brooks - mixing, recording, writing, production
DJ Rek - turntables
Alan Douches - mastering
Paul Romano - artwork

References

External links
 
 Bandcamp page

2016 albums
Dälek albums
Profound Lore Records albums
Musique concrète albums